Tilghman Island is an island in the Chesapeake Bay. It is part of Talbot County, Maryland, United States.

History 
Initially known as Great Choptank Island, the island became identified with a series of local families. It was owned by Matthew Tilghman's family from 1752 and has been known as Tilghman Island ever since. During the War of 1812 the island was briefly occupied by the British, who obtained provisions for their military forces. The community of Tilghman appeared in the 1840s. The economy shifted from farming to greater reliance on oystering and fishing as markets developed in Baltimore and Washington, aided by steamboat service in the 1890s.

Historic places
The E.C. Collier, the Elsworth, the Hilda M. Willing, the Kathryn, the Maggie Lee, the Minnie V, the Nellie L. Byrd, the Paw Paw Cove Site, the Ralph T. Webster, the Rebecca T. Ruark, the Reliance, the Ruby G. Ford, Sharps Island Light, the Sigsbee, and the Virginia W are listed on the National Register of Historic Places.

Geography

Tilghman Island is located at  (38.708795, −76.335016).

Demographics

As of the census of 2010, there were 784 people, 357 households, and 246 families residing in the CDP. The racial makeup of the CDP was 97.3%  White, 1.4% African American, 0.5%  Native American, 0.5%  Asian, and 0.3% from two or more races. Hispanic or Latino of any race were 0.6% of the population.

There were 368 households, out of which 24.7% had children under the age of 18 living with them, 64.9% were married couples living together, 3.8% had a female householder with no husband present, and 28.8% were non-families. 23.9% of all households were made up of individuals, and 11.1% had someone living alone who was 65 years of age or older. The average household size was 2.32 and the average family size was 2.72.

In the CDP, the population was spread out, with 19.2% under the age of 18, 5.3% from 18 to 24, 23.8% from 25 to 44, 29.7% from 45 to 64, and 22.0% who were 65 years of age or older. The median age was 46 years. For every 100 females, there were 104.3 males. For every 100 females age 18 and over, there were 100.0 males.

The median income for a household in the CDP was $32,763, and the median income for a family was $38,304. Males had a median income of $21,213 versus $24,286 for females. The per capita income for the CDP was $13,851. About 8.7% of families and 17.7% of the population were below the poverty line, including 24.4% of those under age 18 and 8.9% of those age 65 or over.

References

External links

TilghmanIsland.com

Maryland islands of the Chesapeake Bay
Census-designated places in Talbot County, Maryland
Census-designated places in Maryland
Maryland populated places on the Chesapeake Bay
Landforms of Talbot County, Maryland